The WWC Women's Championship was the top title for women's professional wrestling with the Tigresa in the Puerto Rican professional wrestling promotion, the World Wrestling Council. The championship was established on 1985. Though the championship was abandoned on 1999, it was revived on 2006.

Title history 

Source

Combined reigns

References

External links 
 Wrestling-Titles.com
 Cagematch.net
 Wrestling Information Archive

World Wrestling Council championships
Women's professional wrestling championships